Greystones United AFC is a football club located in Greystones, County Wicklow, Ireland. It boasts one of the country's largest number of teams in total throughout all age groups.

History
2015 saw the merger of Greystones United and town neighbours Greystones A.F.C. The United name was kept and applied to the team competing in the top division of the Leinster Senior League.

The club reached the preliminary round of the 2017 FAI Cup, losing 0-3 at home to Sheriff YC.

Greystones was one of the founding clubs of the Women's Under 17 National League in 2018.

In 2019, Greystones was featured in an episode of BetVictor's Training SOS programme with Liverpool F.C.

Rivalries
Until the merger of the clubs in 2015, Greystones United had a rivalry with town neighbours Greystones A.F.C.

The Women's U17 team have a rivalry with Bray Wanderers.

Within the Wicklow League, Greystones have a rivalry with Newtown United.

References

Association football clubs in County Wicklow
Leinster Senior League (association football) clubs
Sport in Greystones